RSU Football Club (Thai สโมสรฟุตบอลมหาวิทยาลัยรังสิต), is a Thailand football club under the stewardship of Rangsit University based in Pathum Thani. They currently play in Thai League 4 Bangkok & field Region.

Timeline 

History of events of JW Rangsit Football Club:

Honours

Domestic Leagues
Regional League Bangkok Area Division
 Runners Up (1) : 2010

Stadium and locations

Season By Season Record

References
 http://www.siamsport.co.th/Column/140109_138.html
 https://www.facebook.com/rangsituniversityfc

Notes

Association football clubs established in 2009
Football clubs in Thailand
Pathum Thani province
2009 establishments in Thailand